Sebranice is a municipality and village in Blansko District in the South Moravian Region of the Czech Republic. It has about 600 inhabitants.

Notable people
František Kovář (1888–1969), patriarch of the Czechoslovak Hussite Church

References

Villages in Blansko District